Elvis' Gold Records Volume 5 is the final album in the RCA Golden/Gold Records series by American singer and musician Elvis Presley (which began in 1958), and the only volume in the series to be issued posthumously. The album was released by RCA Records in March 1984 on both LP and compact disc. The album is a compilation of hit singles released between 1968 and 1977. It is the only one of the series not to make the Billboard album chart, "bubbling under" at #207 for two weeks. It was certified
Gold on 7/15/1999 by the RIAA.

Content
Gold Records Volume 5 comprises nine Top 40 A-sides along with one b-side, "For the Heart" from 1976. Released more than sixteen years since the previous installment in the series, it covers a span of almost ten years. The first side of the album focused on Elvis' late 1960s comeback-era recordings: "If I Can Dream" was taken from his comeback special, three singles from the American studios sessions "Suspicious Minds", "Kentucky Rain", and "In The Ghetto", and "Clean Up Your Own Backyard" was a soundtrack recording from The Trouble with Girls.  The second side contained Elvis' late period singles including "Burning Love" and "Moody Blue". RCA apparently  did not base the track  selection solely on commercial factors, as two top ten hit singles from this time period, "Don't Cry Daddy" from 1969 and "The Wonder of You" from 1970, were omitted.

Originally recorded at RCA Studio B in Nashville, Tennessee, RCA Studio C in Hollywood, Western Recorders in Burbank, California, Stax Studio and in The Jungle Room in Memphis, Tennessee. Original recordings produced by Felton Jarvis, Chips Moman, Bones Howe and Billy Strange.

Reissues
RCA reissued the album on July 15, 1997, and added six bonus tracks taken from a three-year span from 1967 to 1970, including three additional Top 40 singles.  The original album sequence was largely left intact, though "If I Can Dream" was moved to the end of the disc.  RCA's selection of bonus tracks is somewhat puzzling as it features several of  Elvis' pre-comeback recordings, rather than 1970s hits; "Always On My Mind", "Promised Land", "Steamroller Blues", "Separate Ways", "Hurt", "T-R-O-U-B-L-E", "I Really Don't Want To Know", and "Until It's Time for You to Go" were among Elvis' top forty hits during the decade.  Only "Memories" which was featured on Elvis' comeback special and "You Don't Have To Say You Love Me", a top twenty single in 1970 are consistent with the selection from the original album.  Three of the bonus tracks are from soundtrack recordings, "Big Boss Man" and "Guitar Man" were originally released as bonus songs from the Clambake album (as well as two late 1960s hit singles) and "Edge of Reality" is from Live a Little, Love a Little (it was also the B-side to "If I Can Dream").  The remaining track, "U.S. Male" was a 1968 single.

Collective personnel

 Elvis Presley – vocals, guitar
 Scotty Moore – guitar
 Chip Young – guitar
 James Burton – guitar
 John Wilkinson – guitar
 Charlie Hodge – guitar, backing vocals
 Jerry Reed – guitar
 Mike Deasy – guitar
 Tommy Tedesco – guitar
 Harold Bradley – guitar
 Jerry McGee – guitar
 Morton Marker – guitar
 Joseph Gibbons – guitar
 Neil Levang – guitar
 Charles Britz – guitar
 Alvin Casey – guitar
 Dennis Linde – guitar
 Bill Sanford – guitar
 Reggie Young – guitar
 Ed Kollis – harmonica
 Charlie McCoy – guitar, organ, harmonica
 Pete Drake – steel guitar
 Floyd Cramer – piano
 Glen D. Hardin – piano
 Don Randi – piano
 David Briggs – piano
 Bobby Wood – piano
 Bobby Emmons – organ
 Bob Moore – bass
 Larry Knechtel – bass
 Charles Berghofer – bass
 Max Bennett – bass
 Norbert Putnam – bass
 Emory Gordy – bass

 Jerry Scheff – bass
 Tommy Cogbill – bass
 Mike Leech – bass
 D. J. Fontana – drums
 Buddy Harman – drums
 Hal Blaine – drums
 Gary Coleman – drums
 Frank Carlson – drums
 John Guerin – drums
 Jerry Carrigan – drums
 Ronnie Tutt – drums
 Gene Chrisman – drums
 Boots Randolph – saxophone
 The Jordanaires – backing vocals
 J.D. Sumner and the Stamps – backing vocals
 Millie Kirkham – backing vocals
 The Blossoms – backing vocals
 B.J. Baker – backing vocals
 Sally Stevens – backing vocals
 Bob Tebow – backing vocals
 John Bahler – backing vocals
 Dolores Edgin – backing vocals
 June Page – backing vocals
 Kathy Westmoreland – backing vocals
 Joe Babcock – backing vocals
 Dolores Edgin – backing vocals
 Mary Greene – backing vocals
 Ginger Holladay – backing vocals
 Mary Holladay – backing vocals
 June Page – backing vocals
 Susan Pilkington – backing vocals
 Sandy Posey – backing vocals
 Donna Thatcher – backing vocals
 Hurschel Wiginton – backing vocals

Track listing
''Chart positions taken from the Billboard singles chart

Original release

References

External links
 

Elvis Presley compilation albums
1984 greatest hits albums
RCA Records compilation albums
Compilation albums published posthumously